Joaquim Ramada (born 27 June 1950) is a Portuguese sailor. He competed in the 470 event at the 1976 Summer Olympics.

References

External links
 

1950 births
Living people
Portuguese male sailors (sport)
Olympic sailors of Portugal
Sailors at the 1976 Summer Olympics – 470
Place of birth missing (living people)